The list of Serbian anthems includes all official and unofficial national anthems that Serbia has had throughout its history. The list also contains the national anthem dedicated to the first Serbian archbishop and founder of the autocephalous Serbian Orthodox Church, Saint Sava.

Himna Svetom Savi and Vostani Serbije are among the first (albeit unofficial) Serbian anthems. The exact date when the anthem dedicated to Saint Sava was written is not known, while the Pesma na insurekciju Serbijanov, ie Vostani Serbije, was composed in 1804 when it was sung by the Serbian educator Dositej Obradović out of a desire to welcome the outbreak of the First Serbian Uprising. However, the first official, national anthem of Serbia was Bože pravde, written by Jovan Đorđević and composed by Davorin Jenko, which is also one of the oldest anthems in the world. Bože pravde was also the official anthem of Republika Srpska (until 2008, when the anthem Moja Republika was adopted) and Republika Srpska Krajina.

In the Kingdom of Serbs, Croats and Slovenes and Kingdom of Yugoslavia that existed between 1918 and 1941, a segment of Bože pravde constitued the National Anthem of the Kingdom of Yugoslavia.

List

Anthems of Serbia

Himna Svetom Savi

Gallery

See also 

 List of Serbian flags

References 

Anthems of Serbia
Serbian culture
Serbia
Anthems